Cube World is a series of electronic toys developed by Radica Games and Mattel between 2005 and 2009. Each Cube World cube contains an animated stick figure who is able to interact with the figures in other cubes when connected together.

Description 

Cube World cubes can be assembled together by magnets on top of one another or side by side. Each cube contains a stick figure that has a unique animation it performs by itself and with others, such as playing a musical instrument or lifting weights. When the cubes are combined, the figures interact with one another, and can move from cube to cube, with up to four at a time in any display across a maximum network of sixteen cubes. The cubes also contain an in-built gyroscope, animating the figures when the cube is tilted upside down. Each cubes also contain unique games played with the buttons, and feature over 100 animations.

Sets 

Cube World was released as 22 different models across six series. Some units in each series were released as a 'Special Edition', in which the cubes were encased in translucent plastic. In Japan, Cube World was distributed by Bandai, which contained identical animations but featured variations to the Radica and Mattel color schemes.

History 

Cube World was initially developed by Conceptioneering Ltd, a company consisting of Crowborough-based inventor and electrical design engineer Tony Ellis and his wife Judie. Ellis was inspired to create the toy based on the design of a block of flats, stating "I started wondering what the people who lived there were up to...we ended up with these cubes with stickmen where you can see what's going on inside these windows." Cube World was initially distributed in 2005 at a retail price of $30 USD for a pair. On October 3, 2006, Mattel acquired Radica Games and incorporated its properties, including Cube World, expanding the brand into a global market. 

Cube World was a commercial success, selling several million units according to Ellis, and received positive reviews from consumer publications.  Michael Fereday of Gadget Speak praised the game as possessing an "interesting fascination beyond their simple graphics," stating "it is amazing what these characters get up (to) either individually or in various combinations." In 2007, Cube World was nominated as the "Electronic Toy of the Year" by Toy Industry Association at the North American International Toy Fair.

References

Electronic toys
Toy brands
2000s toys